Walter L. "Mother" Watson (January 27, 1865 – November 23, 1898) was an American professional baseball player in the mid-1880s. Born in Middleport, Ohio in 1865, he started two games at pitcher for the  Cincinnati Reds of the American Association. He completed one of his starts, and in 14 innings pitched, he had a 5.79 ERA, and was 0–1. In , he played for the Zanesville Kickapoos of the Tri-State League.  In November 1898, Watson was shot in an "Election Day" saloon brawl and later died of his injuries at the age of 33. He is interred at Middleport Hill Cemetery.

References

External links

 Retrosheet

1865 births
1898 deaths
Cincinnati Reds players
Major League Baseball pitchers
People from Middleport, Ohio
Baseball players from Ohio
19th-century baseball players
Deaths by firearm in Ohio
Zanesville Kickapoos players